Pedro José Calderón (1832–1885) was a 19th-century Peruvian lawyer, diplomat and politician. He was born in Lima. He graduated from the National University of San Marcos and served on its faculty. He served in the Chamber of Deputies of Peru and Senate of Peru. He was Prime Minister of Peru (September–November 8, 1865) and foreign minister of Peru (October 14, 1864 – November 6, 1865).

Bibliography
 Basadre, Jorge: Historia de la República del Perú. 1822 - 1933, Octava Edición, corregida y aumentada. Tomos 4, 5, 6 y 7. Editada por el Diario "La República" de Lima y la Universidad "Ricardo Palma". Impreso en Santiago de Chile, 1998.
 Tauro del Pino, Alberto: Enciclopedia Ilustrada del Perú. Tercera Edición. Tomo 3. BEI/CAN. Lima, PEISA, 2001. 
 Vicuña Mackenna, Benjamín: La campaña de Lima. Santiago, 1881. En Biblioteca Cervantes.

1832 births
1885 deaths
19th-century Peruvian lawyers
Peruvian diplomats
Foreign ministers of Peru
Members of the Chamber of Deputies of Peru
Members of the Senate of Peru
Academic staff of the National University of San Marcos
National University of San Marcos alumni
Politicians from Lima